Terry Long may refer to:

Terry Long (footballer) (1934–2021), English footballer
Terry Long (American football) (1959–2005), American football player
Terry Long (white supremacist) (born 1946), Canadian white supremacist
Terrence Long (born 1976), American baseball player
Terry Long, a character from DC Comics' Teen Titans